This is a Glossary of acronyms used for aircraft designations in the Russian Federation and formerly the USSR. The Latin-alphabet names are phonetic representations of the Cyrillic originals, and variations are inevitable.

Terms

2 Istrebitel – N1 – two-seat fighter with Napier engine see DI-1

2 Motor Gelikopter – twin-engined helicopter

Artilleriskii Korrektirovshchik – artillery correction

Aeroopylitel – air duster Po-2

Aeropyl – air dust Po-2

ARKtichyeskii - arctic

 -

 Arkadiy Shvetsov-led engine design bureau prefix, coming from the OKB-19 bureau

Amfibiya Severnogo Kraya – amphibian for northern territory

Blizhnii Bombardirovshchik – short-range bomber

Bombardirovshchik D D - Bolkhovitnov

Boyevoi Desantnyi Planer – troops assault glider

Blizhniy Istrebitel – short-range fighter

- towed mine glider

 -

 -

Blizhniy Pikiruyushchiy Bombardirovshchik – short-range dive bomber

 -

 -

 -

Bronirovannyy Shturmovik – armoured ground attack aircraft

see TsKB

1. - two-seat fighter
2. Dalnost - distance/range

1. Dal'niy Bombardirovshchik – long-range bomber
2. Dnevnoi Bombardirovshchik – day bomber

Dauhl'niy Bombardirovshchik-A – long-range bomber, academy

Dauhl'niy Bombardirovshchik-LK -

 -

suffix Dauhl'niy Deystviya  - long-range

Dauhl'niy Dvuhkmestny Bronirovannyi Shturmovik - long-range two-seat close support aircraft

 -

 -

Dvukhmesnyy Istrebitel'  - two-seat fighter

Dvukhmyestnyi Istrebitel Pushechny – two-seat cannon fighter

1. Dvukhmotortnyi Istrebitel Soprovozhdyenyia – twin-engined escort fighter
2. Dalnyi Istrebitel Soprovozhdyeniya – (ДИС, Дальний истребитель сопровождения – long-range escort fighter)

Dvukhmyestnyi Istrebitel T - two-seat fughter - 2-seat shturmovik version of I-152

Dvukhmotornyi Krayenoi Linyeinyi - regional airliner

 -

Dal'niy Perekhvahtchik – long-range interceptor

 - long-range glider torpedo

Dvigatel' [izdeliye] R [Tu-4] – engine test-bed [product] R [Tu-4] Myasischev inhouse designation for engine test aircraft.

Dnevnoy Skorosnoy Bombardirovshchik - fast day bomber

Dalnyi Vysotnyi Bombardirovshchik – long-range high-altitude bomber

Eksperimentalnyi - experimental

Eksperimentalnyi Apparat – experimental apparatus – usually prefixed by a number

Eksperimental Dvigatyel – experimental engine

Eksperimentalnyi Gelikopter – experimental helicopter

 Eksperimentalyni Istribetel – experimental fighter

 Eksperimentalyni Odnomyestnyi Istribetel – experimental single-seat fighter

Frontovoy Istrebitel – frontal fighter

Foto Samolyet – Photographic aircraft

Gelikopter – helicopter

Gidro-Aeroplan Spetsialno Naznachyeniya – seaplane special destination

Giperzvukovya letayuschchaya Laboratoriya – hypersonic flying laboratory

 -

Gidro Samolyet Transportnaya – hydro aircraft transport – pby-1 Catalina

1. Izdeliye - product or article
2. Istrebitel''' – fighter

 -
  Istrebitel-Bombardirovschik - fighter bomber / strike fighter Istrebitel' Dahl'nevo Deystviya – long-range fighter

 -

 -Istrebitel' [s dvigatelem] Liberty [moschnost'yu] 400 [loshadinykh sil] - fighter with a 400hp Liberty engine Polikarpov IL-400Istrebitel' odnomestny Pushechnyi – single-seat cannon fighterIstrebitel' Pushyechnii – fighter, cannon

1. Istrebitel' Skladnoi – folding fighter
2. Istrebitel' Soprovozhdyeniya – escort fighter
3. Istrebitel' Sylvanskii – fighter SylvanskiiIstrebitel' Shturmovik – fighter attackIstrebitel' Tyazhelyi – heavy fighterIstrebitel' Tyazhelyi Pushechnyi – heavy fighter with cannonIstrebitel' VyisokoSkorostnyi – high speed fighterIzdeliye Z - project Z

1. -
2. Koor'yerskiy - courierKhimichyevskii Boyevik – chemical fighterKorabelnii O Razvedchik – shipboard catapult reconnaissance

 -

1. Korabelniy Razvedchik –  (корабельный разведчик - Shipboard Reconnaissance)
2. Katapul'tiruyemoye Kreslo [izdeliye] R [Tu-4] – ejection seat test-bed [product] R [Tu-4] Myasischev inhouse designation for ejection seat test aircraft.
3. Kreiser Razvyedchik - cruiser reconnaissance)

 - Avietka non OKB designed light aircraftKr'lya Tank – flying tank

 -

 Летающая Атомная Лаборатория - letayuschchaya ahtomnaya laboratoriya - flying nuclear laboratoryLegkii Bombardirovshchik – light bomberLegkii Bombardirovshchik-2LD – light bomber with 2 lorraine-Dietrich enginesLegkii Bombardirovshchik Sparka – light bomber, two seaterLegkii Bronirovannyi Shturmovik – (ЛБШ, Легкий бронированный штурмовик – light armored attack aircraft)Lev Pavlovich Malinovski- 1930s director of NTU-GVFLeningradskii Institoot Grazdahnskovo Vozdooshnovo Flota-  Leningrad Institute civil air fleet

1. Legkii Kreiser – light cruiser
2. Leningradskii Kombinat – Leningrad combine

 - light utility transport 1994Letayuschchaya Laboratoriya - flying laboratory

 -

 -Legkii Razvedchik – (ЛР, Легкий разведчик – light reconnaissance)Laminarnyi Sloi – laminar layerLyegkii Shturmovik – (ЛШ, Легкий штурмовик – light attack)Letayushchiy Tank – flying tank

 -long-range flying torpedoMishen – [radio-controlled] target radio-controlled versions of production aircraft had the OKB designation replaced with M, thus the RC target Il-28 became the M-28Mestnaya Amfibiya – regional amphibian

 -

 -Morskoi Blizhnii Razvedchik – marine short-range reconnaissanceMorskoi Dalnii Razvedchik – marine long-range reconnaissanceMorskoi Dalnii Razvedchik Torpedonosyets – (МДРТ, Морской дальний разведчик-торпедоносец – long-range sea recon/torpedo bomber)

 -

 -Mnogotselevoy Gruzovoy Samolet - multi-role cargo aircraft

 -

 -Morskoi Kreiser – sea cruiserMorskoi Minonosyets – marine mine carrier

 -Malya Mod Shturmovik – experimental engine attacker

1. Motor Planer – motor glider
2. Morskoi Passazhirskii – naval passenger transport
3. Morskoi Podvesnoi – marine suspended

1. Mnogomestnyi Pushyechnyi Istrebitel – (МПИ, Многоместный пушечный истребитель – multi-seat cannon fighter)
2. Morskoi Poplavkovyi Istrebitel – sea floatplane fighterMorskoi Razvedchik – naval reconnaissanceMorskoi Razvedchik Liberty – naval reconnaissance, Liberty engineMorskoi Samolyet – naval aircraft

 -Morskoi Torpedonosyets – naval torpedo carrierMorskoi Torpedonosyets-Bombardirovshchik – naval torpedo carrier-bomberMorskoi тяжелый Torpedonosyets-Bombardirovshchik  – (МТБТ, Морской тяжелый бомбардировщик-торпедоносец – Heavy sea bomber/torpedo bomber)Morskoi Uchyebnii – naval trainerMorskoi Uchyebnii Rhone – naval trainer, Rhone engine

 -Nochno-artillerisykyi Korrektirovshchik – night artillery observerNochnoi Bombardirovshchik – night bomberNochnoy Blizhniy Bombardirovshchik – short-range night bomber

 -Odnomestnyi Bronirovanny Shturmovik (ОБШ, Одноместный бронированный штурмовик – single-seat armored attack aircraft)

 -Odnomestnyi Dvukhmotorny Bronirovanny Shturmovik – single-seat twin-engined armoured attack aircraft

 -

 -Odnomestnyi Pikiryushchyi Bombardirovshchik - (ОПБ, Одноместный пикирующий бомбардировщик – single-seat dive bomber)

 -

 - deck based aircraftOdnomotornyi Shturmovik – single-engined attack

 -

1. Perekhodnyi Pyervyi - intermediate
2. Passazheerskiy – passenger

 -

1. Planer Bombardirovshchik – glider bomber
2. Pikiriyushchii Bombardirovshchik – dive bomberPushechnyy Bronirovannyi Shturmovik (ПБШ, Пикирующий бронированный штурмовик – cannon-armed armoured assault aircraft)Perekhvatchik [s ToorboKompressorom] Dollezhalya – interceptor with a dollezhal' designed superchargerPushechnii Istrebitel – cannon fighterPassazhirskii Leningrad – passenger transport LeningradPassazhirskii Maybach – passenger transport Maybach engine

 -

1. Passazheerskiy Samolyot – airliner / passenger aircraft
2. Proxrachnyy Samolyot – transparent aircraftPlaner Spetsial'no Naznachenaya – glider for special purposes

 -

 -

1. Razvedchik – reconnaissance
2. Reaktivnii - jetRazvedchik-Bombardirovshchik – reconnaissance-bomberRekord Dalnosti – long distance record aircraftRekord Dalnost Diesel'nyi – diesel-engined long-range record aircraft

 -Rot front – Red Front

 -

 -

1. Razreznoye Krylo – slotted wing
2. Razdvizhnoye Krylo – extending wingRazdvizhnoye Krylo - Istrebitel – extending wing fighter

 -

 -Razvedchik Otkrytogo Morya – reconnaissance open sea

1. -
2.Raketnyy Plahner – rocket-powered glider

 -

 -Rekord Vysoty – record height

 -

 -

1. Skorostnoi - speedy
2. Sparka – twin / coupled
3. Samolet - aircraft
4. Strelovidnoye [krylo] – swept wings

Russian: Скоростной бомбардировщик - Skorostnoi Bombardirovschik - high speed bomber,

 -

 -

1. Skorostnyi Dnyevnoi Bombardirovshchik – high-speed day bomber
2. Strategicheskiy Dal'niy Bombardirovshchik – strategic long-range bomber

 -Samolyot Yefremova i Nadiradze – Yefremova and Nadiradze's aircraft UT-2NSamolet Gonochnii - Racing AeroplaneShturmovik – attack

1. Shturmovik Bombardirovshchik – ShB (ШБ, Штурмовик-бомбардировщик – attack/bomber)
2. Shturmovik Brovirovanny –  armoured attack aircraft

 -

 -

 -Shturmovik Osobogo Naznachyeniya – (ШОН, Штурмовик особого назначения – special purpose attack aircraft)Shassi [izdeliye] R – undercarriage [product] R [Tu-4] Myasischev inhouse designation for bicycle u/c test aircraft.Shtabnoi Samolet – staff aeroplane

 -Skorostnii Krylo – high-speed wing

 - Avietka non OKB designed light aircraftSanitarnyi Kabina Filatov – ambulance cabinSyel'skolkhozyaistyennyi - agriculturalSamoletnyy Komandno-Izmeritel'nyy Punkt – airborne measuring and control point Beriev Samolyot 976

 -

 -Samolet Osobogo Naznachyeniya – aircraft special/personal assignment

1. Spetzprimeneniya or Spetsialno Primeneniya – special purposes
2. Stratosfernyi Plane – stratospheric gliderSkorostnoi Pikiruyushchnyi Bombardirovshchik – (СПБ, Скоростной пикирующий бомбардировщик – high-speed dive bomber)Skorostnoi Pikiruyushchnyi Bombardirovshchik / D – fast dive bomber / DSkorostnoi Pikiruyushchnyi BombardirovshchikPoplavkii – fast dive bomberfloatSkorostnoi Pikiruyushchnyi BombardirovshchikBSB – fast dive bomber -

 Samolet Passazheerskiy Dal'niy - long-range passenger aircraft???? - (Ilyushin Il-18)

1. Svyazno Passazhirskii L – liaison passenger
2. Samolyet dlya Podvodnikh Lodok – aeroplane for submarine boats Skorostnoi Passazhirskii Samolet – high-speed passenger aircraftskorstnoi Razvedchik – (СР, Скоростной разведчик – high-speed reconnaissance)Skorostnoi Razvedchik Bombardirovshchik – high-speed reconnaissance-bomberStratosfernii Samolyet – stratospheric aircraftSkoropodyemnyi Skorotrelnyi – speedster, high-speed lift, fast-shooter

 -Samolyet UrkVozdukhPut – aircraft Ukrainian civil aviation authoritySamolet Vozdushnogo Boya – aircraft for air combat

1. Torpedonosyets – torpedo carrier
2. Treugol'noye(треугольный) [krylo] - triangular wingTransportnaya Amfibiya – transport amphibianTransportnaya Amfibiya Fotografichyeskii – transport amphibian, photographicTyazholyy Bombardirovshchik – heavy bomberTreneirovochni Istrebitel (ТИ, Тренировочный истребитель – trainer fighter)Tyazhelyi Istrebitel Soprovozhdeniya – heavy escort fighterTyazhelyi Istrebitel Soprovozhdeniya Mnogotsyelevoi -A – heavy escort fighter, multirole ATjazholij Krejser - heavy cruiserTorpedonosyets Otkrytogo Morya – (Торпедоносец открытого моря – Torpedo bomber for open seas)

 - thick wing section

 -Transportnyi Samolet – transport aircraftTyazheli Shturmovik – heavy attacker

 -

 - Avietka non OKB designed light aircraft - Pissarenkouchebnyy - trainerUniversal'noye letayushchyeye Krylo – universal flying wing Grokhovskii G-37Uchyebno-erekhodnoi Bombardirovshchik – training transitional bomber

 -Upravleniye Pogranichnym Sloyem – boundary layer control[sistema] oopravleniya [izdeliye] R – control [system] [product] R[Tu-4] Myasischev inhouse designation forpowered flying control system test aircraft.

 -Uchebno Trenirovochnyy - trainerUchebno Trenirovochnyy Bombardirovshchik – bomber trainerUchebno-trenirovochnyy Istrebitel'  - fighter trainerUchebno-trenirovochnyy Pikeeruyushchiy Bombardirovshchik – dive bomber trainer

 - Avietka non OKB designed light aircraft

 -

 -Vysotnyi Istrebitel – high altitude fighter

 -Vozdushnyi Istrebitel Tankov – aerial tank fighter

 -Vladimir Myasischev-Transportnaya -  Vladimir Myasischev - TransportVozdushnii Nabludatyelnii Punkt - aerial observation point

 -

 -Vysotnyi Perekhvatchik – high altitude interceptorVystavlyaet Samolyet – demonstration aircraftVysokoSkorostnyi Istrebitel  – high speed fighter

 -

 -Yedinitsa - one-off / single unit

 Zveno-link/flight

 -

OKB / Constructor Prefixes

Charomskii engines

Yakovlev in-house designations

Antonov

Arkhangyelskii

Beriev

Beresnyak - Isayev

Chelomey

Chyetverikov

Grigorovich in-house designations

Gudkov

Ilyushin

Koleznikov-Tsybin

Lavochkin

Lavochkin-Gorbunov-Gudkov

Lisunov

Mikoyan i Guryevich

Mil

Myasischev

Kuznetsov engines

Nikitin in-house designations

Petlyakov

Polikarpov

Rafaelyants in-house designations

Shavrov

Shchyerbakov

Sukhoi

Tsybin

Tupolev

Yakovlev in-house designations

Yakovlev

Yermolayev

Designation suffixes & prefixes
 

1. (suffix) Ahtomnyy – atomic,  i.e. nuclear capable
2. (suffix)  - assault

1. (suffix) Artilleriskii Korrektirovshchik – artillery correction
2. (suffix) A [dlya podgotovki] Kosmonahvtov – A for cosmonaut training

(suffix) Apparatoora Kosmicheskoy Svyazi – space communications equipment

(suffix) Avtomatizeerovannaya [sistema] Lyotnovo Kontrolya – automatic flight check system

(suffix) AS – Slovakian upgrade MiG-29AS

(suffix)  A Trahnsportnyy – A transport Il-18

 (suffix)  A Trahnsportnyy Reaktivnyye Dvigateli – A transport Jet engine

(suffix) A Trahnsportnyy Ooskoriteli - A transport boosters

1. (suffix) Bombardirovshchik – bomber
2. (suffix) Biplahn - biplane
3. (suffix) B – second version MiG-31B

(suffix)  -

(suffix)  - MiG-23

1. (suffix) B Modernizeerovannyy – B modernised MiG-31
2. (suffix) Beloroosskaya Modernizahtsiya – Belorussian upgrade MiG-29BM
3. (suffix) Booksirovshchik Misheney – target tug

(suffix)  -

(suffix) B Stroyevaya [modernizahtsiya] – B in-service up-grade

1. (suffix) BuksirTralshchik – towing minesweeper
2.  (suffix) B Trahnsportnyy – B transport Il-18

(suffix) Bombardirovshchik-Razvedchik – bomber / reconnaissance

1. (suffix) Dahl'nomer - rangefinder
2. (suffix) - MiG-27
3. (suffix)  - MiG-31D ASAT launcher
4. (suffix) Derevyannyy - wooden
5. (suffix) Dahl'niy - long-range
6. (suffix) Dorabotannya - revised
7. (suffix) Dvookhmesnyy - two-seat

(suffix) Dahl'niy Bombardirovshchik  - long-range bomber

(suffix) Dahl'niy Istrebitel'  - long-range

(suffix) Dopolnitel'nyye Motor – supplementary engine

(suffix) [Samolyto] Dahl'niy Okeahnskiy Razvedchik Ryby – long-range ocean fishery reconnaissance aircraft

(suffix) Dvukmestnyi Polutoplan – two-seat sesquiplane

(suffix) Dahl'niy Strategicheskiy Razvedchik – long-range strategic reconnaissance aircraft

(suffix) Desahntno-Trahnsportnyy i Sanitarnyy – assault transport/ambulance

(suffix) Dvoinyi Upravlenii – war control

(suffix)  -  Pe-2DV

(suffix) DoZaprahvka – in-flight refuelling

1. (suffix) Ekranoplan – wing in ground effect
2. (suffix) Eksportnyy - export
3. (suffix) Eksperimentahl'nyy - experimental

1. (suffix) Forseerovannyy - uprated
2. (suffix) Fonar – canopy
3. (suffix) Fotograficheskiy – photo
4. (suffix) Fotorazvedchik - Photo-reconnaissance

(suffix) Frontovoy Eksportnyy – frontal/tactical export MiG-31

(suffix) FotokartGraficheskiy – photo survey / mapping

(suffix) FotoKartgraficheskiy – photo mapping

(suffix) FotoKartgraficheskiy Modernizeerovannyy – photo mapping, modified

(suffix) FotoKartgraficheskiy Modernizeerovannyy Passazheerskiy – photo mapping, passenger

(suffix)  -

(suffix)  -

(suffix) Frontovoye Trebovaniye – front-line request

(suffix) Frontovoye Zadaniye –

(suffix) Glavnaya Gheofizicheskaya Observatoriya – geophysical observatory

1. (suffix) Gak – hook arrestor hook equipped
2. (suffix) G - Germany MiG-29G German upgraded
3. (suffix) Ghidrosamolyot - floatplane
4. (suffix) Groozovoy – cargo

1. (suffix) Gruzovymi Kassetami – underwing cargo container
2. (suffix) Germetichyeskoi Kabine – hermetic pressure cabin

(suffix) Groozovoy – cargo

(suffix) Groozovoy, Modernizeerovannyy – cargo, modified

(suffix) Golos Nyeba – voice from the sky

(suffix) GT – Germany upgraded trainer MiG-29GT German upgraded

1. (suffix) Indeeskiy - Indian
2. (suffix) Issledovatel'skiy – research
3. (suffix) Istrebitel – fighter
4. (suffix) Izrail'skoye [obroodovaniye] – Israeli [equipment]

(suffix) Istrebitel Bombardirovshchik – fighter bomber

(suffix) Istrebitel soprovozhdeniya – escort fighter

(suffix) Istrebitel' Shtoormovik – attack fighter

1. (suffix)  - MiG-27
2. (suffix) Kabina – cabin
3. (suffix) Kommerchesky – commercial for export
4. (suffix) Kompleks [vo'oruzheniya – weapons [system]
5. (suffix) Konverteeruyennyy - convertible
6. (suffix) Korabelnyi – ship based
7. (suffix) Korotkonogii – short legged
8. (suffix) Korrektovovshchik – correction
9. (suffix) [dlya podgotovki] Kosmonahvtov – for cosmonaut training

(suffix) Kombineerovnannaya Artillerisko Bombardirovochnaya Batareya Mozharovskovo i Venevidova – combined gun/bomb battery spotter designed by Mozharovskiy and Venevidova

(suffix) Kholod - cold cryogenic fuel testbed

1. (suffix) -  MiG-27KR
2. (suffix) KorrektiRovschchik – artillery spotter

(suffix) Korabel'nyy Oochebnyy – shipboard trainer

(suffix) Korabel'nyy Oochebno-Boyevoy – shipboard combat trainer MiG-29KUB

(suffix) Korotkiy Vzlyot Posahdka – short landing/STOL

1. (suffix) Laborotoriya – laboratory
2. (suffix) Lesozashchita – forestry protection
3. (suffix) Limuzin – cabin transport
4. (suffix) Lyuks – de Luxe

(suffix) Lytno-Ispytatel'nyy Kompleks – flight test complex

(suffix) Letyushchaya Laborotoriya – flying laboratory

(suffix) Letyushchaya Laborotoriya - Protivolodochnoy Obrony – flying laboratory – [ASW] anti submarine warfare

(suffix) Lyegkii Nochnoi Bomardirovshchik – light night bomber

(suffix) LesopPozharnyy - forest patrol

(suffix) Lyezhachi Polozheni Lyetchik – prone position pilot

(suffix) Ledovyy Razvedchik – ice reconnaissance

(suffix)0 Limuzin Svyarznoi -

1. (suffix) Lyzhnoye Shassee – ski undercarriage

2. (suffix) Lyokhkiy Shtoormovik – light attack aircraft

(suffix)  -

1. (suffix) Manevreeruyushchaya - manoeuvering
2. (suffix) Mishen - target
3. (prefix) Mishen – [radio-controlled] target
4. (suffix) Morskoi - marine
5. (suffix) Modernizeerovannyy – up-dated/modernised
6. (suffix) Modifikatsirovanni - modified
7. (suffix) Modifitseerovannyy – modified
8. (suffix) Morskoi - marine
9. (suffix)  - meteorological

1. (suffix) Modifitseerovannyy, Dorabotannyy - modified, upgraded
2. (suffix) Modifitseerovannyy, Dahl'niy - modified, long-range

(suffix) Modernizeerovannyy Eksportnyy – up-dated/modernised export MiG-29ME

(suffix) Modifikahtsya dlya Filipin – Philippines export version MiG-29MF

(suffix) Ministerstvo Grazhdahnskoy Aviahtsii – ministry of civil aviation Il-76MGA

1. (suffix) Modifitseerovannyy Konverteeruyemyy – modified, convertible Il-76MK
2. (suffix) Mekhanizeerovannoye Krylo – mechanised wings fitted with high lift devices

(suffix) Modifitseerovannyy, Lyohkiy - modified lightweight

(suffix) Modifitseerovannyy, Lyohkiy, Ametist - modified lightweight fitted with Amethyst RADAR

(suffix) Modifitseerovannyy, Lyohkiy, Dorabotannyy - modified lightweight, upgraded

(suffix) Modifitseerovannyy, Lyohkiy, Dorabotannyy, Gardeniya - modified lightweight, upgraded, [fitted with] Gardenia radar

(suffix) Modifitseerovannyy, Lyohkiy, Gardeniya - modified lightweight, [fitted with] Gardenia radar

(suffix) Modifitseerovannyy, Lyohkiy, S - modified lightweight, S

(suffix)  Mahlovysotnaya Mishen - low-altitude target

(suffix) Malya Mod Shturmovik – experimental engine attacker

(suffix)  -  electronic countermeasures

(suffix) MeteoRazvedchik – weather reconnaissance

(suffix)  -

(suffix) MiShen - target

(suffix)  -

(suffix)  Modifitseerovannyy Vo'oruzhonnyy – modified armed

(suffix)  Modernizeerovannyy/Zaprahvshchik – modernised/tanker

1. (suffix) Nositel' [yadernovo oroozhiya] – [nuclear weapons] carrier
2. (suffix) Nositel' [spetsboyepripasa] – [special weapons] carrier
3. (suffix) N – [Malaysian export] MiG-29
4. (suffix) Nit – [fitted with] Nit'-S1[SLAR]

(suffix) NochnoArtilleriskyi Korrektovovshchik – night artillery correction

(suffix) N Uchebno-Boevoy –[Malaysian export]  combat trainer MiG-29

(suffix) Odnomestnyi Biplan – single-seat biplane

(suffix)  Opytnny Experimental'nyy Samolyot – prototype experimental aircraft

1. (suffix) Odnomestnyi Nizkoplan – single-seat low-wing monoplane
2. (suffix) Osobogo Naznachyeniya – special/personal assignment

(suffix) OPerahtorskiy [samolyot] – [camera] operators [aircraft]

(suffix) Okeahnskiy Razvedchik Ryby – ocean / fishery reconnaissance aircraft

(suffix) Opyshyennyi Stabilizator – trimmed stabiliser

(suffix) Otklonyayemyy Vektor Tyaghi – thrust vector control

1. (suffix) Passazheerskiy – passenger
2. (suffix) Perkhvatchik' – interceptor
3. (suffix) Pushechnyy – cannon armed
4. (suffix) Pochtovyy [samolyot] – mailplane
5. (suffix) Poplavkii – floats
6. (suffix) Poolsa – stripe
7. (suffix) Pozharnyy – forestry protection
8. (suffix) Pererabotannyy - re-worked

(suffix) Perkhvatchik' Aerostahtov – balloon interceptor

(suffix) Planer Bombardirovshchik – glider bomber

1. (suffix) Perkhvatchik' Dorabotanny – interceptor modified
2. (suffix) Podyomnyye Dvigateli – lift engines

(suffix) Perkhvatchik' Dorabotanny v Stroyoo – interceptor modified field-modified

(suffix) Perkhvatchik' Dorabotanny Zaprahvka – interceptor modified re-fuelling

(suffix)  - photo mapping

(suffix)  -

(suffix)  -

(suffix)  -

(suffix) ProtivoLodochnyy - Anti-submarine

(suffix) Protivolodochnoy Obrony – [ASW] anti submarine warfare

1. (suffix) Pilotazhnyy Modifitseerovannyy – aerobatic modified
2. (suffix) Perekhvatchik' Modernizeerovannyy – interceptor modified

(suffix) Perekhvatchik' Modernizeerovannyy U – interceptor modified boosted

(suffix) polar

1. (suffix) Postanovshchik Pomekh – ECM aircraft
2. (suffix) Protivopozharnyy – fire fighting

(suffix) Patanovchik Pamech Aktivni'i – comint and jamming platformPoikovo-spasahtel'nyy Reaktivnyy [Ooskoritel'] Trahnsportnyy – SAR boosted transport

1. (suffix) Pilotazhnyy Spetsiahl'nyy – aerobatic special
2. (suffix) Pilotazhnyy Samolyot – aerobatic aircraft
3. (suffix) Poiskovo-Spahtel'nyy – search and rescue

(suffix) Perkhvatchik' Teplvaya golovka samonavedeniya – interceptor with IR seeker head

(suffix) Protivovozdushnaya Oborona – air defence

(suffix) Pryamototchnyye Vozdooshno Reaktivnyye Dvigatel - ramjets

(suffix) Perekhvatchik' Oochebnyy – interceptor trainer

(suffix) Perekhvatchik' Oochebnyy – Samolyot Optiko-Televizionnovo Nablyudeniya – interceptor trainer – optical/TV surveillance aircraft

(suffix)  -

1. (suffix)  -  Mi-10
2. (suffix) Razvedchik – reconnaissance
3. (suffix) Reaktivnyy – jet propelled reaction engines
4. (suffix) Rekordnyi - record

(suffix) Razvedchik Bombardirovshchik – reconnaissance bomber

RBF (suffix) Razvedchik Bombardirovshchik [izdeliye 02]F – reconnaissance/bomber/electronic reconnaissance [fitted with 'Shar' sigint package in izdeliye02]F

(suffix) Razvedchik Bombardirovshchik s apparatooroy Koob – reconnaissance/bomber/electronic reconnaissance fitted with 'Koob' sigint package

(suffix) Razvedchik Bombardirovshchik Nochnoy – night reconnaissance/bomber/electronic reconnaissance

(suffix) Razvedchik Bombardirovshchik s apparatooroy Sablya – reconnaissance/bomber/electronic reconnaissance fitted with 'Sablya' SLAR

(suffix) Razvedchik Bombardirovshchik s apparatooroy Shompol – reconnaissance/bomber/electronic reconnaissance fitted with 'Shompol' sigint package

(suffix) Razvedchik Bombardirovshchik s apparatooroy Tangazh – reconnaissance/bomber/electronic reconnaissance fitted with 'Tangazh' sigint package

(suffix) Razvedchik Bombardirovshchik s apparatooroy Virazh – reconnaissance/bomber/electronic reconnaissance fitted with 'Virazh' sigint package

(suffix) Razvedchik Bombardirovshchik s apparatooroy Virazh Dorabotannyy dlya Zapravki – reconnaissance/bomber/electronic reconnaissance fitted with 'Virazh' sigint package and in flight refuelling

(suffix) Razvedchik Bombardirovshchik s apparatooroy Shompol Dorabotannyy dlya Zapravki  – reconnaissance/bomber/electronic reconnaissance fitted with 'Shompol' sigint packageand in flight refuelling

(suffix)  Razvedchik Ryby – fisheries reconnaissance

(suffix)  Reaktivnyy Dvigatel – jet propelled engine

(suffix) [Samolyot] RahdioElektronnoy Bor'byy – electronic countermeasures aircraft

(suffix) [Samolyot] RahdioElektronnoye Oboroodovaniye – electronic equipment test-bed [aircraft]

(suffix) RahdioElektronnoye Protivodeystviye - ECM Electronic Counter-Measures [aircraft]

(suffix) Rahdio Lokatsionnyy Dozor – radar picket

(suffix) [samolyot] Razvedchik, Modifitseerovannyy – modified reconnaissance aircraft

(suffix)  - fisheries reconnaissance

(suffix) [samolyot] Radiotsionnyy Razvedchik – radiation intelligence [aircraft]

(suffix) Radiotsionnyy Razvedchik Vysotnyy – radiation intelligence [aircraft], high altitude

1. (suffix) Reaktivnyy [ooskoritel'] Trahnsportnyy - jet booster transport
2. (suffix) ReTranslyator – relay installation

(suffix) ReTranslyator Laborotoriya – relay installation laboratory

(suffix) [Samolyot] RahdioTekhnicheskoy Razvedki – electronic reconnaissance aircraft

(suffix) Razvedchik Oochebnyy – reconnaissance aircraft, trainer

1. (suffix) Razvedchik Vysotnyy – reconnaissance aircraft, high altitude
2. (suffix) Reaktivnyy [Ooskoritel'] V – boosted V  An-24RV

1. (suffix)  - MiG-29S
2. (suffix) Salon – vip aircraft
3. (suffix) Sanitarnyy - medical
4. (suffix) Sapfeer – [fitted with] Sapfeer [radar]
5. (suffix) Sereeynyy / Serinyi -series / production
6. (suffix) Stabilizator - stabiliser
7. (suffix) Strelovidnoye [krylo] – swept wings

(suffix) Sistema Avtomaticheskovo Oopravleniya – [fitted with] automatic control system

(suffix) S Dozaprahvka – S in-flight refuelling MiG-29SD

(suffix) Skorostnyi Dnyevnoi Bombardirovshchik – high-speed day bomber

(suffix) Samolyot-Dooblyor Komety – Kometa missilemanned analogue MiG-17SDK

(suffix) S Eksportnyy – S export MiG-29SE

(suffix) Shturmovik - attack

(suffix) Shatbnoi Samolyet – staff aeroplane

(suffix) Shtabnoy Trahnsportnyy – Staff/HQ transport

(suffix) Samolyotnyy Izmeritel'nyy Poonkt – airborne measuring station

1. (suffix) Spetsiahl'nyy Komahndnyy [samolyot] – special command [aircraft]
2. (suffix) Samolyotnyy Komahndno-[izmeritel'nyy poonkt] – airborne [measuring and] control [point] ULL-76 / ULL-76-02

(suffix) Sel'skoKhozyaistvennyy - agricultural sprayer/duster

(prefix) Samolyot-Laboratoriya – laboratory aircraft Leninets re-designated their research aircraft with the prefix SL, thus the Il-18SL was probably more correctly designated the SL-18A

(suffix) S Modernizeerovannyy - S modernised MiG-29SM

(suffix) S Modernizeerovannyy Toplivo – up-dated/modernised, fuel Mig-29SMT

(suffix)  -  border surveillance Mi-8Salon Obslooga – VIP service personnel

(suffix) Spetsializeerovannyy Oftal'mologicheskiy Letayushchiy Filiahl – specialised ophthalmic [surgery] flying branch office

(suffix) SpetzPrimeneniya or Spetsialno Primeneniya – special purposes

(СР, Скоростной разведчик – high-speed reconnaissance)

(suffix) Skoropodyemnyi SkoroStrelnyi – speedster, high-speed lift, fast-shooter

(suffix) [izdeliye S] trenirov-ochnoy Katapool'toy – training ejection system UTI-MiG-15stk

(suffix) Spahrennoye Oopravleniye – dual controls

1. (suffix) Tankovyi – tank buster
2. (suffix) Tahksi - taxi
3. (suffix) Teplovaya [glovka Samonavedeniya] – Infra-Red seeker
4. (suffix) Toplivo - fuel
5. (suffix)  Torpedonosyets – torpedo carrier
6. (suffix) Trahnsportnyy – transport
7. (suffix) Trenirovochnyy – proficiency trainer
8. (suffix) Tryokhkolyosnoye Shasee – tri-cycle undercarriage
9. (suffix) Tyazhelovo'oruzhonny – heavily armed
10. (suffix) Treugol'noye(треугольный) [krylo] - triangular wing

1. (suffix) Trahnsportno-Booksirovshchik – transport / glider tug
2. (suffix)  -  Mil Mi-8TB

(suffix)  -  Mil Mi-8TBK

(suffix) Trahnsportno-Desahntnyy – transport / assault aircraft

1. (suffix) Trahnsportno-Groozovoy – transport / cargo
2. (suffix)  -  LPG powered Mi-8

1. (suffix)  – anti-tank
2. (suffix)  - thin wing
3. (suffix) Trahnsportnyy, Konverteeruyemyy – convertible passenger/cargo
4. (suffix) ToorboKompressorom - turbo-charged

(suffix) ToorboKompressorom Ghermeticheskoy Kabinoy - turbo-charged [engine], hermetically sealed cabin

(suffix) Torpedonosets Modifitseerovannyy – modified torpedo bomber

(suffix) Trahnsportno-Sanitarnyy – transport / medical

1. (suffix) Torpedonosets Poplavkovyy – Torpedo carrier floatplane
2. (suffix) Trahnsportno-Paasazheerskiy – cargo / passenger

(suffix) Trahnsportnyy V – transport V

1. (suffix) Uchebnyi (Учебный - "Trainer")
2. (suffix) Uloochshennyy – improved

(suffix) Oosovershenstvovannyy, Dereviannyy - improved, wooden

(suffix) Oochebnyy Fotosoprovozhdeniye – trainer-photographic support

(suffix) Uchebno-Boevoy – combat trainer

(suffix) Uchebno-Boevoy Toplivo – combat trainer, fuel MiG-29UBT

(suffix) Uchebno-Boevoy Modernizeerovannyy – combat trainer, modernised MiG-29UBM

(suffix) oochebnyy Sdoov [Pogranichnovo Sloya] – trainer with BLC

1. (suffix) Oochebno Shtoormanskiy [Samolyot] – navigator trainer aircraft
2. (suffix) U Shtoormanskiy [Samolyot] – U trainer aircraft  I-153USh

(prefix) Ooniversahl'naya letyuschchaya Laboratoriya – universal flying laboratory

1. (suffix) Oochebnyy, Modernizeerovannyy – upgraded trainer
2  (suffix)  Uloochshennyy M – improved M new build Yak-9U's

(suffix)  -

(suffix) Uchyebno Trenirovochnyi – conversion/proficiency/educational training

(suffix) Uchyebno Trenirovochnyi Gak – educational training with arrestor hook

(suffix) oochebno Trenirovochnyy Istrebitel'  - fighter trainer

(suffix) Uloochshennyy Vyvoznoy – improved familiarisation training

(suffix) Ookorochennyy Vzlyot i Posahdka - STOL

1. (suffix)  - floatplane An-2 floatplane
2. (suffix)  - Il-18
3. (suffix) Vysotnyy – height/high-altitude
4. (suffix) Vyvoznoy – familiarisation training

(suffix)  Vysotnyi ToorboKompressorom Germetichyeskoi Kabine – high-altitude turbo-charged hermetic pressure cabin

(suffix) Visotnyi Bombardirovshchik – high altitude bomber

(suffix) Visotnyi Istrebitel – (ВИ, Высотный истребитель – high-altitude fighter)

(suffix) Vozdooshno-Kosmicheskiy – air/space [satellite launcher]

(suffix) Vozdooshnyy Komahndnyy Poonkt – Airborne command post

(suffix)  -

(suffix) Vozdooshnyy Poonkt Oopravleniya – airborne command post

(suffix) Vozdooshno Reaktivnyye Dvigatel - ramjets

(suffix) Vozdooshno-Reaktivnyy Dvigatel' Kompressornovo Tipa – compressor-type air-breathing engine

(suffix) Voiskovoi Seriya – military series

1. (suffix) V Trahnsportnyy – V transport Il-18
2. (suffix) Voyenno-Trahnsportnyy [samolyot] – military transport aircraft Il-114VT

VV (suffix) Vertikahl'nyy Vzlyot – vertical take-off

(suffix) Vozduzhni'i Zapasdnoi Punkt Upravlenya – aerial emergency command post

(suffix) Zondirovshchik Atmosfery – atmosphere sampler

(suffix) Zhidkosnyy[reaktivnyy dvigatel] – liquid fuelled [rocket motor]

(suffix) Zavod Imyennyi Goltsman – Works named for Goltsman

References

Gordon, Yefim. Early Soviet Jet Bombers. Hinkley, Midland. 2004. 
Gordon, Yefim. Early Soviet Jet Fighters. Hinkley, Midland. 2002. 
Gordon, Yefim. Sukhoi Interceptors. Hinkley, Midland. 2004. 
Gordon, Yefim. Soviet Rocket Fighters. Hinkley, Midland. 2006.  / 
Gordon, Yefim. Soviet Heavy Interceptors. Hinkley, Midland. 2004. 
Gordon, Yefim. Lavochkin's Last Jets. Hinkley, Midland. 2004.  / 
Gordon, Yefim & Komissarov, Dmitry & Komissarov, Sergey. OKB Ilyushin. Hinkley, Midland. 2004. 
Gunston, Bill. The Osprey Encyclopaedia of Russian Aircraft 1875 – 1995. London, Osprey. 1995. 
Antonov, Vladimir & Gordon, Yefim & others. OKB Sukhoi. Leicester. Midland. 1996. 
Gordon, Yefim. Komissarov, Dmitry & Sergey. OKB Yakovlev. Hinkley. Midland. 2005. 
Gordon, Yefim & Komissarov, Dmitry. OKB Mikoyan. Hinkley, Midland. 2009. 
Gordon, Yefim. Komissarov, Dmitry & Sergey. OKB Ilyushin. Hinkley. Midland. 2004. 
Gordon, Yefim & Rigmant, Vladimir. Tupolev Tu-144. Midland. Hinkley. 2005.  
Gordon, Yefim & Komissarov, Dmitry. Antonov An-12. Midland. Hinkley. 2007.  
Gordon, Yefim & Komissarov, Dmitry & Komissarov, Sergey. Mil's Heavylift Helicopters. Hinkley, Midland. 2005. 
Gordon, Yefim. Tupolev Tu-160 "Blackjack". Hinkley, Midland. 2003. 
Gordon, Yefim & Komissarov, Dmitry. Antonov's Jet Twins. Hinkley, Midland. 2005. 
Gordon, Yefim & Komissarov, Dmitry. Kamov Ka-27/-32 Family. Hinkley, Midland. 2006.  
Gordon, Yefim & Komissarov, Dmitry. Antonov An-2. Midland. Hinkley. 2004. 
Gordon, Yefim & Rigmant, Vladimir. Tupolev Tu-114. Midland. Hinkley. 2007.  
Gordon, Yefim & Komissarov, Dmitry. Ilyushin Il-12 and Il-14. Midland. Hinkley. 2005.  
Gordon, Yefim. Yakovlev Yak-36, Yak-38 & Yak-41. Midland. Hinkley. 2008. 
Gordon, Yefim. Komissarov, Dmitry & Sergey. Antonov's Turboprop Twins. Hinkley. Midland. 2003. 
Gordon, Yefim. Myasischev M-4 and 3M. Hinkley. Midland. 2003. 
Gordon, Yefim & Rigmant, Vladimir. Tupolev Tu-104. Midland. Hinkley. 2007. 
Gordon, Yefim. Komissarov, Dmitry. Mil Mi-8/Mi-17. Hinkley. Midland. 2003. 
Gordon, Yefim & Dexter, Kieth Polikarpov's I-16 Fighter. Hinkley. Midland. 2001. 
Gordon, Yefim. Mikoyan MiG-25 "Foxbat". Hinkley. Midland. 2007.  
Gordon, Yefim & Dexter, Kieth Mikoyan's Piston-Engined Fighters. Hinkley. Midland. 2003. 
Gordon, Yefim & Rigmant, Vladimir. Tupolev Tu-4. Midland. Hinkley. 2002. 
Gordon, Yefim. Sukhoi S-37 and Mikoyan MFI. Midland. Hinkley. 2001 reprinted 2006.  
Gordon, Yefim. Khazanov, Dmitry. Yakovlev's Piston-Engined Fighters. Hinkley. Midland. 2002. 
Gordon, Yefim. Sal'nikov, Andrey. Zablotsky, Aleksandr. Beriev's Jet Flying Boats. Hinkley. Midland. 2006.  
Gordon, Yefim. & Dexter, Keith. Polikarpov's Biplane Fighters. Hinkley. Midland Publishing. 2002. 
Gordon, Yefim. Soviet/Russian Aircraft Weapons''. Midland. 2004. 
Tupolev SB Wikipedia Tupolev SB

Glossaries of Russian and USSR aviation
Soviet Union
Wikipedia glossaries using description lists